The 1962 football season was São Paulo's 33rd season since club's existence.

Statistics

Overall

{|class="wikitable"
|-
|Games played || 71 (7 Torneio Rio-São Paulo, 30 Campeonato Paulista, 34 Friendly match)
|-
|Games won || 41 (2 Torneio Rio-São Paulo, 19 Campeonato Paulista, 20 Friendly match)
|-
|Games drawn || 16 (4 Torneio Rio-São Paulo, 5 Campeonato Paulista, 7 Friendly match)
|-
|Games lost || 14 (1 Torneio Rio-São Paulo, 6 Campeonato Paulista, 7 Friendly match)
|-
|Goals scored || 158
|-
|Goals conceded || 98
|-
|Goal difference || +60
|-
|Best result || 5–0 (A) v Once Caldas - Friendly match - 1962.10.205–0 (H) v Prudentina - Campeonato Paulista - 1962.11.08
|-
|Worst result || 1–5 (A) v Corinthians - Friendly match - 1962.06.03
|-
|Most appearances || 
|-
|Top scorer || 
|-

Friendlies

Troféu Lourenço Fló Junior

Taça São Paulo

Official competitions

Torneio Rio-São Paulo

Record

Campeonato Paulista

Record

External links
official website 

Association football clubs 1962 season
1962
1962 in Brazilian football